Cheshmeh Ziarat Rural District is a rural district (dehestan) in the Central District of Zahedan County, Sistan and Baluchestan province, Iran. At the 2006 census, its population was 21,950, in 4,445 families. At the 2016 census, its population had risen to 34,693.

References 

Zahedan County
Rural Districts of Sistan and Baluchestan Province
Populated places in Zahedan County